The men's 200 metres event  at the 1985 IAAF World Indoor Games was held at the Palais Omnisports Paris-Bercy on 19 January.

Medalists

Results

Heats
The winner of each heat (Q) and next 7 fastest (q) qualified for the semifinals.

Semifinals
First 3 of each semifinal (Q) qualified directly for the final.

Final

References

200
200 metres at the IAAF World Indoor Championships